Irene Sheila Faith (née Book; 3 June 1928 – 28 September 2014) was a British politician and dental surgeon. She served one term each in the House of Commons and European Parliament as a Conservative. She was a native of Newcastle upon Tyne and attended Newcastle upon Tyne Central High School and the University of Durham.

Early career
Faith qualified as a dental surgeon in 1950, the same year she married Dennis Faith. She was a Justice of the Peace serving on the bench in Northumberland and later in Newcastle upon Tyne. She began her political career in 1970 when she was elected to Northumberland County Council from a division in Newcastle, and served until the area was removed from the county in boundary changes in 1974. She then fought Newcastle upon Tyne Central in the October 1974 general election. From 1975 to 1978 she was a member of Newcastle upon Tyne City Council for the ward of Newburn No. 3.

Parliament
In 1977 Faith was selected as candidate for Belper, a constituency in Derbyshire which was narrowly held by Labour. She managed a reasonable swing in the 1979 general election in line with the national average, which was enough to win the seat by 882 votes. Sheila Faith was one of the two woman out of 77 newcomers when she entered the House of Commons in 1979. In Parliament she became known for her internationalism, sat on the committee on unopposed Private bills, and was Secretary of the Conservative backbench Health and Social Services Committee from 1979–83. She spoke on behalf of the pharmacists, nurses, and on medical affairs in general.

Boundary changes due to be implemented at the 1983 general election abolished the Belper constituency, with the majority of the voters going to a new South Derbyshire constituency which was estimated to be easier for Labour to win. Faith decided that she would not offer herself for reselection there, but attempted to get a more winnable seat elsewhere. She attended several selection committees but was not selected, and therefore went out of Parliament after one term. South Derbyshire selected another woman, the younger Birmingham city councillor Edwina Currie, who was elected with a majority of more than 8,000.

European Parliament and after 
The decision of Elaine Kellett-Bowman to stand down as Member of the European Parliament for Cumbria in favour of her seat in the British Parliament gave Faith the opportunity to resume a political career at the headquarters of the European Community, of which she was a strong supporter of British membership.

Later, she was elected MEP for Cumbria and Lancashire North in the 1984 European election, and served one term before retiring. She was a member of the Committee on Energy, Research, and Technology. Sellafield was located in the constituency.  She was appointed as an unpaid member of the Parole Board of England and Wales from 1991 to 1994 by the Conservative government. Sheila Faith was president of the Cumbria and Lancashire North Constituency Council from 1989–95.

References

External links
 

1928 births
2014 deaths
English dentists
Women dentists
English Jews
Conservative Party (UK) MPs for English constituencies
UK MPs 1979–1983
Conservative Party (UK) MEPs
20th-century women MEPs for England
MEPs for England 1984–1989
Female members of the Parliament of the United Kingdom for English constituencies
Jewish British politicians
Jewish women politicians
Members of the Parliament of the United Kingdom for constituencies in Derbyshire
20th-century British women politicians
Alumni of King's College, Newcastle
20th-century dentists